Efstathios Dimitrios Kappos (born July 31, 1979) is a Canadian football (soccer) player, who plays for Agios Dimitrios. Now he plays in a local club in a north suburb of Athens, Neopedelikos.

Career
Kappos has played his entire football career in Greece, most lately serving lower league sides. He did however enjoy short spells at Greek premier league sides AEK Athens and Aris Saloniki as well as a couple of seasons with Kalamata.

Kappos has left Akratitos F.C. on a free transfer to join Messiniakos F.C. (C Ethniki - South) on 2 August 2006. Kappos played previously with  Aris FC and AEK Athens F.C. while Messiniakos F.C. is in first place in their division in the 2006/2007 season.

International career
He played his one and only game for the Canada national soccer team on 18 January 2004 against Barbados national football team in a friendly game.

References

External links 
  (archive)
 

1979 births
Living people
AEK Athens F.C. players
Aias Salamina F.C. players
A.P.O. Akratitos Ano Liosia players
Aris Thessaloniki F.C. players
Association football fullbacks
Canada men's international soccer players
Canadian expatriate soccer players
Canadian expatriate sportspeople in Greece
Canadian people of Greek descent
Canadian soccer players
Fostiras F.C. players
Kalamata F.C. players
Messiniakos F.C. players
Soccer players from Toronto
Super League Greece players
Thyella Patras F.C. players